Flavobacterium ahnfeltiae  is a Gram-negative, polysaccharide-degrading, aerobic, rod-shaped and motile bacterium from the genus of Flavobacterium which has been isolated from the alga Ahnfeltia tobuchiensis.

References

 

ahnfeltiae
Bacteria described in 2015